MV Yasa Jupiter is a Turkish-owned, Marshall Islands-flagged bulk carrier. It was the first merchant vessel damaged during the 2022 Russian invasion of Ukraine.

Characteristics 
Yasa Jupiter has a maximum tonnage of 61,000 DWT. It is operated by a crew of 19 people.

The ship

History 
On 24 February 2022, Yasa Jupiter was transiting through the Black Sea on its way to Romania after having unloaded its cargo in Odessa, Ukraine. While underway, the vessel was struck by a missile which hit one of its hatch covers and shattered the windows in the bridge. None of the nineteen crew (8 Turks and 11 Ukrainians) were injured and the vessel was able to continue on its course to Romania.

References 

2019 ships
Maritime incidents in 2022
Cargo ships of Turkey
Bulk carriers
Military history of the Black Sea
Ships involved in the 2022 Russian invasion of Ukraine